Tanjungpura Kingdom was the name of an ancient 8th century kingdom that was located along the southwestern coast of Borneo facing the Java Sea, a region that today corresponds to the Ketapang Regency of West Kalimantan province of Indonesia.

Name 
The kingdom had several names depending on the location of the capital, and this changed multiple times, with the first being in modern-day Ketapang Regency, then at Sukadana in modern North Kayong Regency, and finally near the Matan River, as a result of which it is also called the Matan Kingdom.

Based on Nagarakretagama under the rule of Singhasari, it is also called Bakulapura, with ‘Bakula’ as the Sanskrit name for Mimusops elengi. During Majapahit rule, ‘Tanjungpura’ is used with ‘Tanjung’ as the local name for the kingdom.

External links
  http://ketapangcityku.blogspot.com/2012/07/makam-raja-tanjungpura-ketapang.html
  http://visit-ketapang.weebly.com/tanjungpura-kingdom.html

History of Indonesia